Kagiso Lediga (born 6 May 1978) is a South African Tswana comedian, actor, writer and director. He is the creator and executive producer of the Netflix crime drama Queen Sono which was released on 28 February 2020. Lediga has written and directed noteworthy television comedies including the cult classic The Pure Monate Show, Late Nite News with Loyiso Gola, and the Bantu Hour. He has played leading roles in the films Bunny Chow, Wonder Boy for President and Catching Feelings.

Career
In 2017, Lediga co-produced, directed and starred in the romantic drama film Catching Feelings. On 10 December 2018, Lediga was announced as the creator and one of the executive producers of the Netflix crime drama series Queen Sono. Queen Sono was released on 28 February 2020 to positive reviews. In April 2020, the series was renewed by Netflix for a second season. However, on 26 November 2020, it was reported that Netflix has cancelled the series because of the production challenges brought on by the COVID-19 pandemic.

Filmography

Awards

References

External links
  Official Website
 

South African male comedians
South African male actors
South African television directors
South African television writers
South African Tswana people
Male television writers
South African film directors
1978 births
Living people
University of Cape Town alumni